Union Deposit is an unincorporated community and census-designated place in South Hanover Township, Dauphin County, Pennsylvania, United States. It is part of the Harrisburg–Carlisle Metropolitan Statistical Area.  As of the 2010 census the population of Union Deposit was 407 residents.

Union Deposit (formerly called Unionville and Uniontown) was laid out in 1833 by Isaac Hershey (west end) and Philip Wolfersberger (east end). The village's original growth and namesake comes from construction of the Union Canal, which deposited goods in the area, upon where the village boomed from various commercial enterprises.

Geography
The community is in southeastern Dauphin County, along the southeastern edge of South Hanover Township. Its southern and eastern border follows Swatara Creek, a southward-flowing tributary of the Susquehanna River. Pennsylvania Route 39 (Hershey Road) forms the northeastern edge of the community; it leads southeast  to the center of Hershey and northwest  to Interstate 81.

See also
Other unincorporated communities in South Hanover Township:
Hoernerstown,  to the west
Sand Beach,  to the northeast

References

Harrisburg–Carlisle metropolitan statistical area
Census-designated places in Dauphin County, Pennsylvania
Census-designated places in Pennsylvania